Lenox Corporation is an American manufacturing company that sells tableware, giftware, and collectible products under the Lenox, Dansk, Reed & Barton, and Gorham brands. For most of the 20th century, it was the most prestigious American maker of tableware, as well as making decorative pieces. Several china services were commissioned for the White House. By 2020, it was the last significant manufacturer of bone china in the United States, until the COVID-19 pandemic forced the closure of the company's only remaining American factory.

History
Lenox was founded in 1889 by Walter Scott Lenox as Lenox's Ceramic Art Company in Trenton, New Jersey.  At the start, it made American art pottery, and it was organized as an art studio and not as a factory. It did not produce a full range of ceramic articles but rather one-of-a-kind artwares. The company at first had just eighteen employees. Lenox's products were first displayed at the Smithsonian Institution in 1897.

Lenox's products became popular in the early 20th century, and production moved to a more factory-style operation, making tableware in standard patterns but still with much handworking, especially in the painting.  He faced European competition but commissioned famous American artists, such as William Morley, to decorate his plates. The plates were successful, and he started producing complete sets of dinnerware. In 1906, he changed his firm's name from the Ceramic Art Company to the less-restrictive Lenox Incorporated.

Two of the first patterns Lenox produced were introduced in 1917, the "Ming" and "Mandarin", which were eventually manufactured for over fifty years. Lenox products also became well known in the United States thanks to Frank Graham Holmes, chief designer from 1905 to 1954, who won several artistic awards such as the 1927 Craftsmanship Medal of the American Institute of Architects and the 1943 silver medal of the American Designers Institute. Lenox pieces were the only American porcelain chosen for display in 1928 by the National Museum of Ceramics in Sèvres, France.

In the 1950s, Lenox offered five-piece complete place settings, three-piece-buffet/place settings, and individual tableware pieces. Lenox was the first company to develop a bridal registry.

In 1983, Lenox was acquired by Brown-Forman Corporation. Brown-Forman acquired Dansk International Designs and its Gorham Manufacturing Company division in 1991, which were incorporated into Lenox. In 2005, Brown-Forman sold Lenox, Incorporated, to collectible manufacturer Department 56 for $190 million.

The Lenox company archives, not purchased by Department 56, were donated to several repositories. China-related archival documents were donated to the Rutgers University Libraries. The historical china collections were given to the Newark Museum and the New Jersey State Museum.

Lenox Sales, Inc., filed for Chapter 11 bankruptcy in 2008. On March 16, 2009, Clarion Capital Partners purchased the assets of Lenox and renamed the company Lenox Corporation. Lenox continued some manufacture of bone china dinnerware at its plant in Kinston, North Carolina, built in 1989. Its manufacturing capabilities included enamel dot, etch, color, and microwave metals, and eventually became Lenox's only American factory until its closure in 2020.

In a bankruptcy auction conducted in April 2015, the operating assets of Reed & Barton, a competing maker of flatware, were acquired by Lenox.

Lenox's brands include Kate Spade New York, Marchesa by Lenox, and Brian Gluckstein by Lenox. 

Lenox ceased production at the Kinston factory on March 18, 2020, due to concerns over the COVID-19 pandemic; on April 17 the company announced that the closure would become permanent, with production expected to resume overseas.

In July 2020 Lenox announced that they would permanently close all of their outlet and warehouse stores, also citing the COVID-19 pandemic.

In October 2020, Lenox was acquired by private equity firm Centre Lane Partners.

Presidential collection

Lenox was the first North American bone china to be used in the White House, and the company has since made tableware for six U.S. presidents. They are officially titled:
The Wilson Service: Designed by Frank Holmes. Delivered to the White House between August and November 1918. The pattern is a deep ivory border surrounding a brighter ivory body and two bands of matte gold encrusted with stars, stripes and other motifs. This first set of American made tableware of 1,700 pieces from Lenox cost $16,000.
The Roosevelt Service: Ordered October 1934. It is described as patriotic, bearing a border of 48 gold stars, and the presidential seal in enamel colors on an ivory body.
The Truman Service: Consisting of 1,572 pieces, the pattern includes a border of celadon green flanked by an etched gold band and a 24 karat gold rim on an ivory body. Delivered in early 1952.
The Reagan Service: The pattern are bands of scarlet varying in width depending on the scale of the piece and are framed on each side with etched gold. The presidential seal, in raised gold, partially overlays the red border.
The Clinton Service: The pattern features a border of pale creamy yellow, and images of the White House facades. Each piece in the place setting is decorated with a different pattern, the motifs derived from architectural elements found in the State Dining Room, East Room, and Diplomatic Reception Room. No presidential seal appears.
The Bush Service: Laura Bush first displayed this newest service on January 7, 2009. The porcelain place setting service features a green basket weave border based on a French dinner service believed to have been owned by James and Dolley Madison. The dessert plates replicate a laurel wreath found on Madison's Parisian c. 1799-1805 dinner plates. The serving plates and the rim of other pieces also feature an eagle emblem inspired by an American bald eagle inlay found on the center drawer of the Massachusetts sideboard, believed to have been owned by Daniel Webster.

Lenox tableware is at the vice president's official residence, more than 300 United States embassies, and more than half of the governors' mansions. Dignitaries of the United States Congress and Department of State have received Lenox giftware. The Metropolitan Museum of Art and Smithsonian Institution have Lenox pottery as centerpieces in exhibitions of American decorative arts. The Lenox backstamp is on about half of all fine porcelain dinnerware purchased since the 1950s in America. Beside collectibles, Lenox also produces tableware, serving pieces, vases, and Department 56 items.

References

Books
 Klapthor, Margaret Bown. White House China: 1789 to the Present. The Barra Foundation and Harry N. Abrams: 1999. .

External links

Rutgers University – Lenox archive collection

Kitchenware brands
Porcelain of the United States
Ceramics manufacturers of the United States
Companies based in Trenton, New Jersey
1983 mergers and acquisitions
2005 mergers and acquisitions